Templanza Fountain (Spanish: Fuente de la Templanza) is a fountain in Chapultepec, Mexico City, Mexico.

References

External links
 

Chapultepec
Fountains in Mexico